Crescent City Base Ball Park, originally known as Sportsman's Park (1886–1887), was a sports stadium in New Orleans from 1886 to 1900. The stadium was renamed Crescent City Base Ball Park in 1888 and reopened on February 9, 1888. The ball park was located at City Park Avenue and what is now the Pontchartrain Expressway across from Greenwood Cemetery. 

It was home to the New Orleans Pelicans baseball organization from 1887 to 1900. It was also home to the Tulane Green Wave football team from 1893 to 1900.

See also
New Orleans Pelicans (baseball)
Tulane Green Wave football
Sports in New Orleans

References

New Orleans Pelicans (baseball) stadiums
Tulane Green Wave football venues
American football venues in New Orleans
Baseball venues in New Orleans
Defunct baseball venues in the United States
Defunct college football venues
Defunct minor league baseball venues
Defunct sports venues in New Orleans
Demolished sports venues in Louisiana
Sports venues completed in 1886
1886 establishments in Louisiana